is a mountain in the city of Fujioka, Gunma Prefecture,  Japan. It is also a National Place of Scenic Beauty as determined by the Agency for Cultural Affairs in Japan.

Overview
In premodern times, the mountain was called "Kokuzōsan" and was a center for the Shugendō mountain cults for the worship of Kokūzō Bosatsu. In 1908, the mountain was planted with thousands of Somei Yoshino cherry trees in commemoration of Japan's victory in the Russo-Japanese War. These trees have evolved or mutated, so that the bloom much earlier than in other locations and the flowers last longer. The mountain was designated as a National Place of Scenic Beauty in 1937. The trees on the mountain were designated a Living National Monument in 1948. The mountain became part of the Gunma Prefectural Sakurayama Forest Park in 1989.

Gallery

See also
List of Places of Scenic Beauty of Japan (Gunma)

References

External links

Tourist Guide of Gunma Prefecture
Fujioka city official home page

Mountains of Gunma Prefecture
Fujioka, Gunma
Places of Scenic Beauty
Hanami spots of Japan